Carrie Mae Best,  ( Prevoe; March 4, 1903 – July 24, 2001) was a Canadian journalist and social activist.

Biography 
Carrie was born in New Glasgow, Nova Scotia. She was the daughter of James Prevoe & Georgina Prevoe. In 1925,  she married Albert T. Best. Together, they had one son, named James Calbert Best in 1926. They would later adopt 4 foster children: Berma, Emily, Sharon and Aubery Marshall .

In 1943, she confronted the racial segregation of the Roseland Theatre in New Glasgow. She purchased two tickets for the downstairs seating of the theatre and attempted to watch a film with her son James Calbert Best. Both were arrested and fought the charges in an attempt to challenge the legal justification of the theatre's segregation. Their case was unsuccessful and they had to pay damages to Roseland's owners. However, the experience helped motivate Carrie Best to found The Clarion in 1946, the first black-owned and published Nova Scotia newspaper. It became an important voice in exposing racism and exploring the lives of Black Nova Scotians. In the first edition of The Clarion she broke the story of Viola Desmond who also challenged racial segregation at the Roseland Theatre and whose story became a milestone human rights case in Canada.  In 1952, Carrie Best started a radio show, The Quiet Corner, which was aired for 12 years. From 1968 to 1975 she was a columnist for The Pictou Advocate, a newspaper based in Pictou, Nova Scotia.

Her son James Calbert Best, who helped found The Clarion, went on to become a union activist, senior public servant and high commissioner to Trinidad and Tobago.

In 1977, she published an autobiography, That Lonesome Road.

In 1974, she was made a Member of the Order of Canada and was promoted to Officer in 1979. She was posthumously awarded the Order of Nova Scotia in 2002. She is commemorated on a postage stamp issued by Canada Post on February 1, 2011. Best died at the age of 98 of natural causes in her hometown New Glasgow. She was featured in a Google Doodle on December 17, 2021.

See also 
 Nova Scotia Heritage Day
 Black Nova Scotians

References

External links 
 Order of Canada Citation
 Carrie Best - A Digital Archive

1903 births
2001 deaths
Black Canadian writers
Black Nova Scotians
Canadian women journalists
Journalists from Nova Scotia
Members of the Order of Nova Scotia
Officers of the Order of Canada
People from New Glasgow, Nova Scotia
Canadian women non-fiction writers
Canadian autobiographers
Black Canadian women
Writers from Nova Scotia
Women autobiographers